Michael McFadden may refer to:

 Michael Óg McFadden, Irish Fine Gael politician
 Michael McFadden (sailor), Rhodesian sailor
 Mike McFadden, American businessman